Thomas Bayly (died 20 July 1670) was a seventeenth century Anglican bishop in Ireland.

Bayly, a native of Rutland was educated at the University of Oxford (he was awarded an Oxford Master of Arts {MA Oxon} and a Doctor of Divinity {DD}), and became Chaplain to Augustine Lindsell, Bishop of Peterborough, until his appointment as Dean of Down (1661–1663).Cotton, Henry. He was Archdeacon of Dromore from 1663 to 1664. He was consecrated Bishop of Killala and Achonry on 5 June 1664 and died in post on 20 July 1670

References

Bibliography
 
 
 
 
 

1670 deaths
Alumni of the University of Oxford
Archdeacons of Dromore
Bishops of Killala and Achonry
Deans of Down
People from Rutland
Year of birth unknown